Branka Luković (born January 23, 1995) is a Serbian professional basketball player. She played for the Partizan, Badel 1862, Voždovac, UCAM Jairis, Valencia Basket, Herner TC, Brose Bamberg, Canik Belediyespor, SBŠ Ostrava and Cortegada

Personal life
Branka comes from a basketball family. Her father is Ljubisav Luković, a former basketball player and current basketball coach, her mother was also a basketball player. Branka has two older brothers Uroš and Marko who are also professional basketball players.

References

External links
 Profile at eurobasket.com

1995 births
Living people
Basketball players from Belgrade
Serbian expatriate basketball people in Germany
Serbian expatriate basketball people in Spain
Serbian expatriate basketball people in Turkey
Serbian expatriate basketball people in North Macedonia
Serbian expatriate basketball people in the Czech Republic
Serbian women's basketball players
ŽKK Partizan players
ŽKK Voždovac players
Power forwards (basketball)